The 2013 Oceania Women's Sevens Championship was the third edition of the  Oceania Women's Sevens Championship. It was held from 5–6 October 2013 in Noosa, Australia. Australia were crowned Champions with Fiji as runner-up.

Tournament

Group phase

Finals

References

2013
2013 rugby sevens competitions
2013 in women's rugby union
Rugby sevens competitions in Australia
International rugby union competitions hosted by Australia